General elections were held in Tunisia on 2 November 1969 to elect a President and Chamber of Deputies. At the time the country was a one-party state with the Socialist Destourian Party (PSD) as the sole legal party. In the presidential election, Habib Bourguiba was the only candidate by virtue of his role as the chairman of the PSD. In the Chamber election, the PSD put forward a single list of candidates in each constituency. Voter turnout was 99.8% in the presidential election and 94.7% in the Chamber election.

Results

President

Chamber of Deputies

References

Tunisia
Elections in Tunisia
General election 
Single-candidate elections
One-party elections
Presidential elections in Tunisia
Tunisian general election